Norman Carter Slaughter (19 March 1885 – 19 February 1956), also known as Tod Slaughter, was an English actor, best known for playing over-the-top maniacs in macabre film adaptations of Victorian melodramas.

Early life 
Slaughter was born on 19 March 1885 in Gosforth and attended the Royal Grammar School in Newcastle upon Tyne. The eldest surviving son of 12 children, he made his way onto the stage in 1905 at West Hartlepool. In 1913, he became a lessee of the Hippodrome theatres in the Richmond and Croydon areas of London. After a brief interruption to serve in the Royal Flying Corps during World War I, he returned to the stage.

Career

Early career 
During Slaughter's early career, his stage name was "N. Carter Slaughter" and he primarily played the conventional leading man or character roles. After the war, he ran the Theatre Royal, Chatham before taking over the Elephant and Castle Theatre in London for a memorable few years from 1924 onwards that have since passed into British theatrical legend. His company revived Victorian "blood-and-thunder" melodramas such as Maria Marten, Sweeney Todd, Jack Sheppard, and The Silver King to enthusiastic audiences—not just locals but also sophisticated theatregoers from the West End who might have initially come for a cheap laugh but ended up enthralled by the power of the fare on offer. Slaughter also staged other types of production such as the annual Christmas pantomime, where he cast prominent local personalities in bit parts for audience recognition. Despite a local protest, the Elephant and Castle Theatre was closed down in 1927, after Slaughter's company vacated it several months earlier.

It was in 1925 that he adopted the stage name "Tod Slaughter", but his primary roles were still character and heroic leads. He played the young hero in The Face at the Window, poacher Tom Robinson in "It's Never Too Late To Mend", and village idiot Tim Winterbottom in Maria Marten. He also played the title character in The Return of Sherlock Holmes and D'Artagnan in The Three Musketeers. Silent footage exists of Slaughter acting on stage at the Elephant and Castle in the military melodrama The Flag Lieutenant, in a documentary entitled London After Dark. It is said he briefly retired from acting to become a chicken farmer at the start of the 1930s, but it proved a short-lived venture and he was soon back managing his company, touring the provinces and outlying London theatres with a repertoire of Victorian melodramas.

In 1931 at the New Theatre, London he played Long John Silver in Treasure Island during the day, and body snatcher William Hare in The Crimes of Burke And Hare at night. Publicised as "Mr. Murder", he lapped up his new-found notoriety by boasting he committed 15 murders each day for the duration of the run. Shortly afterwards, he played the title character in Sweeney Todd, the Demon Barber of Fleet Street for the first of 2,000 times on stage. Actor and role had found each other much in the same way as Béla Lugosi and Dracula, and the seal was set on Slaughter's subsequent career.

Film career 
In 1934, at age 49, Slaughter began in films. Usually cast as a villain, his first film was Maria Marten or Murder in the Red Barn (1935), a Victorian melodrama filmed cheaply with Slaughter as the obvious evil-doer, and identified as such at the beginning of the play. In the old melodramatic style, each main member of the cast is introduced before the play begins and has his role explained. When Slaughter comes on, he favours the audience with a cold, evil grin as the on-stage announcer says "Squire Corder, Lord of the Manor...and a villain! Whose blood may be blue—but whose heart is black as night!" This set the general tone for the film series, although the introduction format was not used again.

Slaughter's next film role was as Sweeney Todd in Sweeney Todd: The Demon Barber of Fleet Street (1936), directed and produced by George King, whose partnership with Slaughter was continued in the subsequent shockers: The Crimes of Stephen Hawke (1936); It's Never Too Late To Mend (1937); The Ticket of Leave Man (1938); The Face at the Window (1939) and Crimes at the Dark House (1940). Most of these films were 'quota quickies', films made quickly and cheaply to fulfil a government requirement that a certain portion of all films distributed by British studios had to be British made. Many such were forgettable, low-quality films, but the lack of studio interest paradoxically made for quality in one way: it gave the maker, by default, artistic control over the final product.

There were, however, some non-melodramatic roles in his career. He was a supporting player in The Song of the Road (1937) and Darby and Joan (1937). In Sexton Blake and the Hooded Terror (1938), he played the head of an international gang of supervillains.

Slaughter was busy on stage during World War II, performing Jack the Ripper, Landru and Dr. Jekyll and Mr. Hyde. There were also one-act sketches such as The Touch of a Child.

After the war, Slaughter resumed melodramatic roles on screen and starred in The Curse of the Wraydons (1946), in which Bruce Seton played the legendary Victorian bogeyman Spring-Heeled Jack, and The Greed of William Hart (1948) based on the murderous career of Burke and Hare. These were produced by Ambassador Films at Bushey Studios, who had made a healthy profit rereleasing Tod's 1930s films during the war years.

Later years 
During the early 1950s, Slaughter appeared as the villain in two crime films King of the Underworld (1952) and Murder at Scotland Yard (1953), which was adapted from the seven-part television series 'Inspector Morley: Late of Scotland Yard', starring Patrick Barr, Dorothy Bramhall, and Tucker McGuire. He also still regularly toured the provinces and London suburbs. However, the public's appetite for melodrama seemed to have abated somewhat by this stage and he was declared bankrupt in 1953, owing to a downturn in his touring income. He continued to act in stage productions, such as Molière's The Gay Invalid opposite future horror star Peter Cushing, and acting as the MC at an evening of old-fashioned music hall entertainment.

His last two films were each three episodes of the television series Inspector Morley cobbled together for theatrical release. A version of Spring-Heeled Jack starring Slaughter was one of the first live TV plays mounted by the BBC after the war. He continued performing onstage even at the end of his life.

He was guest on the BBC radio programme Desert Island Discs on 24 March 1955.

Death
On 19 February 1956, at the age of 70, Slaughter died of coronary thrombosis in Derby. After his death, which followed a performance of Maria Marten, his work slipped almost completely into obscurity. Film historians have revived interest in Slaughter's cycle of melodramatic films, placing them in a tradition of "cinema of excess" which also includes the Gainsborough Melodramas and Hammer Horrors.

Filmography

References

Bibliography 
 Richards, Jeffrey (ed.) The Unknown 1930s: An Alternative History of the British Cinema, 1929-1939. I.B. Tauris, 1998.

External links 
 

1885 births
1956 deaths
English male stage actors
English male film actors
Deaths from coronary thrombosis
Royal Flying Corps personnel
20th-century English male actors
British Army personnel of World War I